Najm Sheykhan (also Romanized as Najm Sheykhān; also known as Nāderchekhān, Nadirchikhan, Nadirchkhān, Najm esh Sheykhān, Najm osh Sheykhān, Naz̧m-e Sheykhān, and Naz̧m Sheykhān) is a village in Ijrud-e Pain Rural District, Halab District, Ijrud County, Zanjan Province, Iran. At the 2006 census, its population was 336, in 77 families.

References 

Populated places in Ijrud County